Antoine Gouan (15 November 1733 – 1 September 1821) was a French naturalist who was a native of Montpellier. Gouan was a pioneer of Linnaean taxonomy in France.

He began his studies in Toulouse, later returning to Montpellier, where he studied medicine at the university. Here he was a student of François Boissier de Sauvages de Lacroix (1706–1767), an ardent supporter of Carl Linnaeus. In August 1752, Gouan received his doctorate under the chairmanship of Antoine Magnol (1676–1759), and subsequently practiced medicine at Saint-Éloi Hospital in Montpellier. Soon afterwards his interest turned to natural history.

In 1762 Gouan published a plant catalog of the botanical garden at Montpellier titled Hortus regius monspeliensis. This publication was the first French botanical work that followed the binomial nomenclature of Linnaeus. In 1765 he penned Flora Monspeliaca, and became titulaire at the Montpellier Academy. During this time period he attained a position at the botanical garden, and was in charge of collection and classification of plant species. In 1770 he published an important ichthyological treatise called Historia Piscicum, a work that expanded the number of fish genera that existed in the Linnaean system.

In 1766 he succeeded Sauvages de Lacroix at the Faculty of Medicine, and in 1793 became a foreign member of the Linnean Society of London. During his career he maintained correspondence with several learned scientists and thinkers, which included in addition to Linnaeus; Albrecht von Haller (1708–1777), Jean Guillaume Bruguière (1750–1798), Jean-Jacques Rousseau (1712–1778), Carl Peter Thunberg (1743–1828), et al.

One of his students in Montpellier was Jacques Anselme Dorthès.

In 1790, he was elected a foreign member of the Royal Swedish Academy of Sciences. 

Gouan is credited with planting the first ginkgo biloba in France, a tree that was given to him by naturalist Pierre Marie Auguste Broussonet (1761–1807). Today this tree is reportedly still standing in the botanical garden of Montpellier. During his career he amassed a large collection of algae that was harvested around Marseille.

Taxa with the specific epithet of gouanii commemorate his name, an example being Ranunculus gouanii (Gouan's Buttercup).

References 
 "This article is based on a translation of an equivalent article at the French Wikipedia".

External links 
 IPNI List of taxa described & co-described by Gouan.

18th-century French botanists
French naturalists
French ichthyologists
Members of the Royal Swedish Academy of Sciences
Scientists from Montpellier
1733 births
1821 deaths
Academic staff of the University of Montpellier